This is a list of countries by alcohol consumption measured in equivalent litres of pure alcohol (ethanol) consumed per capita per year.

World Health Organization (WHO) data 
The World Health Organization periodically publishes The Global Status Report on Alcohol:
 1999 was first published by WHO in 1999 with data from 1996.
 2004 is the second global status report on alcohol published in 2004 with data from 2003.
 2011 is the third global report on alcohol published in 2011 with data from 2010.
 2014 is the fourth global report on alcohol published in 2014 data from 2010.
 2018 is the fifth global report on alcohol published in 2018 with data from 2016.

Worldwide 
Percentage of current drinkers among the total population (15+ years)

Countries

Comprehensive list with data from 2016 
The table below for 189 countries uses 2016 data from the WHO report published in 2018. The methodology used by the WHO calculated use by persons 15 years of age or older. All data in columns refer to year 2016. The column "recorded" refers to the average recorded consumption for the period 2010. Unrecorded consumption (homebrew, moonshine, smuggled alcohol, surrogate alcohol etc.) was calculated using expert judgements and surveys. Total is the sum of the recorded and unrecorded consumption. The next four columns are a breakdown of the recorded alcohol consumption by type. Beer refers to malt beer, wine refers to grape wine, spirits refers to all distilled beverages such as vodka and similar products, and the column "other" refers to all other alcoholic beverages, such as rice wine, soju, sake, mead, kumis, cider, kvass, and African beers (kumi kumi, kwete, banana beer, millet beer, umqombothi etc.). Worldwide consumption in 2016 was equal to 6.4 litres of pure alcohol consumed per person aged 15 years or older.

See also 
 List of countries by tea consumption per capita
 List of countries by beer consumption per capita
 List of national drinks

References

Alcohol by country
Consumption
Alcohol